4everevolution is the eighth studio album by English rapper Roots Manuva. It was released on 3 October 2011 on the Big Dada label.

Critical reception
4everevolution was met with "generally favorable" reviews from critics. At Metacritic, which assigns a weighted average rating out of 100 to reviews from mainstream publications, this release received an average score of 75 based on 19 reviews.<

In a review for AllMusic, critic reviewer Jon O'Brien wrote: "4everevolution, shows he [Manuva] can still summarize the state of the nation more succinctly in one line that most MCs half his age manage over the course of an entire album. 4everevolution is an appropriately titled, subtle progression which proves that intelligent hip-hop and accessible urban pop don't have to be mutually exclusive." Reef Younis of Clash said: "The production is crisp and varied; Roots' warm vocal typically hits with soul without being too forcefully firebrand and constant changes in style and tempo gives 4Everevolution the energy to see it through." At Drowned in Sound, Al Horner noted that it was Manuva's "most assured and compelling listen to date."

Track listing

Personnel

Musicians
 Roots Manuva – primary artist, bass, violin
 Harry Bennett – drums
 Larry Blackmon – vocals
 Hannah Caughlin – vocals
 Mark Shaffer – guitar
 Bob Earland – drums
 Amazirée – vocals
 Rokhsan – vocals
 The Banana Klan – choir vocals

'Production
 Roots Manuva – mixing, producer
 Bob Earland – engineer, mixing
 Theo Gordon – engineer
 Patrick McMahon – engineer, mixing
 Kevin Metcalfe – mastering
 Gibbs King – producer, engineer

Charts

References

External links
 

2011 albums
Roots Manuva albums
Big Dada albums